Puccinellia lucida is a perennial grass which grows in south-eastern Canada and occasionally elsewhere in the United States. Its specific epithet lucida means "shining", referring to the plant's lustrous glumes.

Description

It has cauline leaves with flaccid, involute blades. Its basal leaf sheaths can be somewhat purple. The grass flowers from July into August.

Puccinellia lucida is most similar to the species Puccinellia laurentiana, Puccinellia airoides, and Puccinellia macra. From the first two species P. lucida differs in its longer, thinner, and lustrous lemmas; from the first additionally by its scabrous floral branches and softer, greener foliage, and from the second by its longer grain and less exerted panicle. From the third species P. lucida differs in its involute leaves, diffuse panicle, pale spikelets, and longer lemmas.

Habitat and distribution

Puccinellia lucida occurs in saline marches and coastal sands along the lower St. Lawrence River in Quebec, but rare populations have also been found in Wyoming to British Columbia and into California.

References

lucida
Plants described in 1916